was a Japanese herpetologist and ichthyologist. He received his Master's from Stanford University. He is noted for studies of the fish species of Taiwan and on snakes.

Taxon described by him
See :Category:Taxa named by Masamitsu Ōshima

Squalidus iijimae Named in honor of zoologist Isao lijima.

Pungtungia shiraii Named in honor of Kunihiko Shirai.

Aphyocypris kikuchii Named in honor of Yonetaro Kikuchi (1869–1921), collector for the Taipei Museum in Formosa (Taiwan), who collected the type specimen.

Barbodes snyderi Snyder's barb.

Oncorhynchus masou formosanus

Spinibarbus hollandi Named in honor of zoologist-paleontologist William J. Holland.

Partial bibliography
A Review of the Fishes of the Family Mugilidæ Found in the Waters of Formosa
A Review of the Fishes of the Family Centriscidæ Found in the Waters of Formosa
Notes on the Venomous Snakes from the Islands of Formosa and Riu Kiu
A cyclopedia of applied zoology
魚 (Fishes, in Japanese), Tokyo 1940

References

1884 births
1965 deaths
Japanese herpetologists
Japanese ichthyologists
People from Sapporo
20th-century Japanese zoologists